El Tanque Sisley is a football club from Montevideo in Uruguay. They currently play in the Uruguayan 3rd Division.

The club were founded in 1955 with the name Club Atlético El Tanque, on December 15, 1981 the club were amalgamated with Club Cultural y Deportivo Sisley to form Centro Cultural y Deportivo El Tanque Sisley.
Colors were taken from Rosarino Central, one of the big clubs of the F.U.F era.

Titles
Segunda División (3): 1981, 1990, 2009–10, 2016
Tercera División (2): 1986, 1997

Performance in CONMEBOL competitions
Copa Sudamericana: 1 appearance
2013: TBD

Current squad
As of 24 October 2018.

Managers
 Ricardo "Tato" Ortíz (1990)
 Wilmar Cabrera (2000)
 Luis López (2002)
 Julio Acuña (May 1, 2001 – April 17, 2002)
 Luis Duarte (Aug 1, 2009 – May 20, 2010)
 Tabaré Silva (May 22, 2010 – March 6, 2011)
 Ruben Da Silva (March 6, 2011 – Aug 30, 2011)
 Raúl Moller (Aug 30, 2011 – Dec 31, 2012)
 Osvaldo Canobbio (Jan 1, 2013 – Aug 8, 2013)
 Raúl Moller (Aug 9, 2013–2015)
 Julio César Antúnez (Aug 9, 2015–2016)
 Raúl Moller (2017-present)

External links

 Official website (archived, 9 Feb 2017)

 
1955 establishments in Uruguay
Association football clubs established in 1955
Football clubs in Uruguay
Sport in Montevideo